George Chase Clements (December 31, 1901 – August 1971) was a professional American football player for the Cleveland Bulldogs and the Akron Pros. He attended Washington & Jefferson College.

See also
 1925 Akron Pros season
 1925 Cleveland Bulldogs season
 Washington & Jefferson Presidents football

Notes
 

Players of American football from Ohio
Washington & Jefferson Presidents football players
Cleveland Bulldogs players
Akron Pros players
1901 births
Washington & Jefferson College alumni
1971 deaths
People from Richland County, Ohio
People from Mount Vernon, Ohio